Giampaolo Di Magno (born April 1, 1974 in Nettuno) is an Italian football coach and manager, and former professional player. He owns the title no. 49422 since 2011, and the Uefa B licence since 2001. 

Di Magno made one Serie A appearance for AS Roma.

He is the current youth goalkeepers' technical director at Italian Serie A club Juventus, since July 1st, 2019.

References

1974 births
Living people
People from Nettuno
Italian footballers
Serie A players
A.S. Roma players
Calcio Foggia 1920 players
A.C. Carpi players
Latina Calcio 1932 players
Italian expatriate footballers
Expatriate footballers in Brazil
Duque de Caxias Futebol Clube players
Association football goalkeepers
Footballers from Lazio
Sportspeople from the Metropolitan City of Rome Capital